WWBP-LP, UHF analog channel 31, was a low-powered television station licensed to Freedom, Pennsylvania, United States. The station was owned by Benjamin Perez.

The station's license was cancelled by the Federal Communications Commission effective July 14, 2021, due to failing to file for a license for digital operation.

References

External links

Television stations in Pittsburgh
Television channels and stations established in 1999
1999 establishments in Pennsylvania
Defunct television stations in the United States
Television channels and stations disestablished in 2021
2021 disestablishments in Pennsylvania
WBP-LP